Lüderitz is a town in the ǁKaras Region of southern Namibia.

Lüderitz may also refer to:

Places

Namibia
Several places in Namibia have been named after Adolf Lüderitz, a German merchant and colonialist:
Lüderitz Airport
Lüderitz Bay, next to the town
Lüderitz railway station
ǃNamiǂNûs Constituency (formerly Lüderitz Constituency), an electoral constituency in Namibia
Naval Calling Station Luderitz

Europe
Łabiszyn, a town in Poland that was named Lüderitz between 1940 and 1945
Lüderitz, Germany, a village in Germany

People
Adolf Lüderitz (1834–1886), German merchant and founder of German South West Africa
Alexander Lüderitz (born 1973), German former freestyle swimmer
 (1854–1930), German doctor and scientist
 (1858–1930), German painter
 (1864–1909), German diplomat
Wolfgang Lüderitz (composer) (1926–2012), German composer of choral music
Wolfgang Lüderitz (pentathlete) (born 1936), German modern pentathlete

Other
German fleet tender Adolf Lüderitz, a fleet tender of the Kriegsmarine
Lüderitz Reformed Church, a congregation of the Reformed Churches in South Africa (GKSA) in southern Namibia
Lüderitz Speed Challenge, an annual speed sailing event
Monelytrum luederitzianum, a grass endemic to Namibia, commonly known in English as Lüderitz grass